William Hawes was an English musician.

William Hawes may also refer to:

William Hawes (physician) (1736–1808), English founder of the Royal Humane Society
William Hawes (1805–1885), English businessperson and reformer, grandson of the physician